Brandy is the debut studio album by American singer Brandy. It was released on September 27, 1994, by Atlantic Records. Chiefly produced by Keith Crouch, the album contains a range of contemporary genres, including hip-hop, pop-soul, and R&B. Aside from Crouch, Norwood worked with a range of other writers and producers, including R&B group Somethin' for the People, Arvel McClinton, and Damon Thomas.

Upon release, Brandy received generally positive reviews from music critics, who complimented Norwood's appearance, as well as the album's timeless appeal. While the album initially sold slowly, it reached number 20 on the US Billboard 200 and was certified quadruple platinum by the Recording Industry Association of America (RIAA), selling over two million copies in the United States. Worldwide, the album has sold over six million copies.

Four singles were released from the album. "I Wanna Be Down" was chosen as the album's lead single and peaked at number six on the US Billboard Hot 100. The song was critically lauded and was regarded as a standout track on Brandy. The album's second single "Baby" was also well-received and peaked at number four on the Billboard Hot 100. The following two singles, "Best Friend" and "Brokenhearted", peaked at numbers 34 and nine on the Billboard Hot 100, respectively. Brandy and its singles garnered Norwood nominations for various awards, including two Grammy Award nominations. The success of the album allowed Norwood to establish herself as one of the most successful of the then-new generation of R&B female vocalists who emerged during the mid-to-late 1990s.

Background 
In 1990, Norwood's talent led to a binding oral contract with Teaspoon Productions, headed by Chris Stokes and Earl Harris, who obtained her gigs as a backing vocalist for their R&B boy band Immature. The same year, Stokes arranged the production of a demo tape which was handed over to Atlantic Recording Corporation executives. While they liked the material, they found Norwood too young at age 11 and told her to come back when she was 14. In 1993, amid ongoing negotiations with East West Records, Norwood's parents organized a recording contract with Atlantic after auditioning for the company's director of A&R, Darryl Williams. Norwood subsequently dropped out of Hollywood High School later and was tutored privately from tenth grade on.

During the early production stages of her debut on the Atlantic label, Norwood was selected for a role in the ABC sitcom Thea, portraying the 15-year-old daughter of a single mother played by Thea Vidale. Broadcast to mediocre ratings, the series ended after one season, consisting of 19 episodes.<ref name="tva">{{cite web|date=1995-03-12|title=Thea'''s Brandy Bounces Back With Hit Album|work=The Victoria Advocate|url=https://news.google.com/newspapers?id=_T0KAAAAIBAJ&pg=4290,2633642&dq=brandy+album&hl=en|access-date=2010-06-28}}</ref> Norwood appreciated the cancellation of the show as she was unenthusiastic about acting at the time and the taping caused scheduling conflicts with the recording of her album, stating: "I felt bad for everybody else but me. It was a good thing, because I could do what I had to do, because I wanted to sing [...] When Thea was canceled I was like, ‘Okay, I can now put all my focus into my album’."

Recording and production
Atlantic consulted relatively unknown, then-21-year-old writer-producer Keith Crouch, nephew of gospel singer Andraé Crouch, to work with Norwood on the bulk of the throwback, funk-soul production of the album. In a 2012 interview with Vibe magazine, Norwood elaborated that her collaboration with Crouch "was very important for me as a young artist. At the time he was not trying to be like anyone else on radio. He was all about his own sound. [He] gave me real music. He didn’t give me teenybopper records. It was age appropriate, youthful records, but it was still real music. We had a great connection." Crouch would go on to work on 50 percent of Brandy, setting much of the tone of the album, with four from his five tracks becoming singles. While recording her vocals with him, Norwood was inspired by several singers, citing Whitney Houston and gospel group The Clark Sisters as major inspirations, particularly on "Movin' On." However, she struggled to identify with some of Crouch's material at first, especially on "Baby", whose lyrics made her afraid of not being old enough. While Crouch would provide the core sound of the album, Norwood also worked with all-male R&B group Somethin' for the People on several tracks, including "Sunny Day", "Give Me You", and "I Dedicate," the latter of which was later split into three interludes. Damon Thomas co-wrote "I'm Yours" and produced "Love Is on My Side." A then 16-year-old Robin Thicke scored his first co-writing credit on the latter.

Music and lyrics
With Brandy consisting mostly of street-oriented R&B songs with influences from hip hop, the lyrics highlighted her youthful and innocent image. Norwood later summed up the songs on the record as young and vulnerable: "I did not really know much – all I wanted to do was sing. You can easily understand that it is a person who sings genuinely, without any real experience. I sang about being attracted to the opposite sex but had no experience of it." The album's fourth track, "I Dedicate (Part I)", is the first of three where Norwood thanks artists who inspired her for a career in music. In the first part, which lasts one minute and 29 seconds, she mentions Whitney Houston as her "mentor" and "role model".

Singles
"I Wanna Be Down" was released as the album's lead single on September 5, 1994, to positive critical reception. The song peaked at number six on the US Billboard Hot 100 and atop the Hot R&B/Hip-Hop Songs. Internationally, the song peaked at numbers 12 and 11 in Australia and New Zealand, respectively. It was certified gold by the Recording Industry Association of America (RIAA) on November 4, selling over 600,000 copies in the United States by the end of 1994. The song's accompanying music video, directed by Keith Ward, portrays Norwood in her tomboyish image, dancing in front of a Jeep near a forest, surrounded by backup dancers. In December, The Rhythm Nation Hip-Hop Remix of the song, featuring MC Lyte, Queen Latifah and Yo-Yo, was released.

"Baby" was released as the second single on December 24, 1994, to positive critical reception. It became an even larger commercial success than "I Wanna Be Down" peaking at number four both on the Billboard Hot 100 and in New Zealand, while becoming her second consecutive Hot R&B/Hip-Hop Songs number-one. The single sold over one million copies by the end of 1995, being certified platinum by the RIAA. Its accompanying music video, directed by Hype Williams, features Norwood and her company dancing in skiing outfits in Times Square. The song was nominated for Best Female R&B Vocal Performance at the 38th Annual Grammy Awards.

"Best Friend" was released as the third single on June 27, 1995. Although positively received by critics, the song failed to duplicate the commercial success of the previous two singles. It peaked at number 34 on the Billboard Hot 100, but fared better on the Hot R&B/Hip-Hop Songs, where it peaked at number seven. Internationally, the song charted only in New Zealand, where it peaked at number 11. Its accompanying music video, directed by Matthew Rolston, features Norwood and her backup troupe displaying their hip hop dancing skills in front of a garage; Norwood's younger brother Ray J, to whom the song was dedicated, appears in the video.

The re-recorded duet version of "Brokenhearted", with Wanya Morris from Boyz II Men, was released as the fourth and final single on August 22, 1995, to mixed critical reception. It became Norwood's third Billboard Hot 100 top-ten single, peaking at number nine, as well as peaking at number two on the Hot R&B/Hip-Hop Songs. Additionally, it peaked at number six in New Zealand. The single was certified gold by the RIAA on November 10 for shipments of 500,000 units in the United States. Norwood reunited with Williams, director of previous videos for the Human Rhythm Hip Hop remix of "I Wanna Be Down" and "Baby", to film a music video for "Brokenhearted" inside the Oheka Castle.

 Critical reception 

In his review for AllMusic, Eddie Huffman wrote that "this teenage R&B singer hit the Top Ten late in 1994 with "I Wanna Be Down", a representative track from her solid debut album. Brandy knows her way around a hip-hop beat, layering tender-tough vocals over spare arrangements like a lower-key Janet Jackson or a more stripped-down Mary J. Blige. Good songs and crisp production make Brandy a moody, moving success." In 2007, Vibe rated Brandy among the 150 most essential albums since its launch. The magazine found that "Brandy's debut is slow, deliberate, and naive — not for lack of accomplishment, but because the best moments here sound as wide-eyed and new as a first date."People compared the effort with Aaliyah's debut album Age Ain't Nothing but a Number, which was released four months prior, writing: "While everything about Aaliyah screams here-and-now, Brandy's well-groomed blend of gently lilting hip hop and pop-soul has a more timeless appeal. With the poise and sassy confidence of a diva twice her age, Brandy mixes her love songs with tributes to her little brother ("Best Friend"), God ("Give Me You"), the perfect man ("Baby") and older crooners like Aretha and Whitney ("I Dedicate"). While this isn't groundbreaking stuff, Brandy has the pipes to become more than the latest teenage next-big-thing." Anderson Jones from Entertainment Weekly was less enthusiastic with the album. He gave the album a C rating and considered it as: "An album that seems based on the philosophy 'If Aaliyah can do it, why can't I?' except that in singing about best friends, heroes, and puppy love instead of about making love, teen actress Norwood (TV's Thea) acts her age. A premature effort, at best."
In his Consumer Guide, Robert Christgau gave the album a "neither" score, and said it "may impress once or twice with consistent craft or an arresting track or two.  Then it won't."

 Accolades 

|-
! scope="row" rowspan="3"| 1995
| rowspan="3"| Soul Train Music Award
| Best New Artist
| Brandy
| 
| rowspan="3"| 
|-
| Best R&B/Soul Album – Female
| Brandy| 
|-
| Best R&B/Soul Single – Female
| "I Wanna Be Down"
| 
|-
! scope="row" rowspan="2"| 1995
| rowspan="2"| MTV Video Music Award
| Best Rap Video
| "I Wanna Be Down" 
| 
| rowspan="2"| 
|-
| Best Choreography in a Video
| rowspan="2"| "Baby"
| 
|-
! scope="row" rowspan="4"| 1995
| rowspan="2"| Billboard Music Video Award
| Best New R&B/Urban Artist Clip
| 
| rowspan="2"| 
|-
| Best New Rap Artist Clip
| "I Wanna Be Down"
| 
|-
| rowspan="2"| Billboard Music Award
| New R&B/Hip-Hop Artist of the Year
| rowspan="5"| Brandy
| 
| rowspan="2"| 
|-
| R&B Artist of the Year
| 
|-
! scope="row" rowspan="2"| 1996
| rowspan="2"| American Music Award
| Favorite Soul/R&B Female Artist
| 
| rowspan="2"| 
|-
| Favorite Soul/R&B New Artist
| 
|-
! scope="row" rowspan="2"| 1996
| rowspan="2"| Grammy Award
| Best New Artist
| 
| rowspan="2"| 
|-
| Best Female R&B Vocal Performance
| "Baby"
| 
|-
! scope="row"| 1996
| MTV Video Music Award
| Best Cinematography in a Video
| "Brokenhearted"
| 
| 
|}

 Commercial performance Brandy debuted at number 94 on the US Billboard 200 for the week ending on October 15, 1994.
In its 25th week on the chart it peaked at number 20, remaining on the Billboard 200 for 89 consecutive weeks. On the US Top R&B/Hip-Hop Albums chart the album debuted at number 11. In its 14th week on the chart it peaked at number six, where it charted for 87 consecutive weeks. Brandy was the 52nd best-selling album of 1995, with 1.2 million copies sold in the country. By March 2002 the album had sold 2.12 million copies in the United States, according to Nielsen SoundScan. To date the album is certified quadruple platinum by the Recording Industry Association of America (RIAA) for four million shipped units.

In Canada, Brandy debuted on [[RPM (magazine)|RPM' s Top Albums/CDs]] chart at number 46 during the week ending on January 30, 1995. In its third week on the chart the album reached its peak at number 20, during the week of February 13, 1995. Overall, the album had spent a total of 28 consecutive weeks on the Top Albums/CDs chart. On June 27, 1995 Brandy was certified gold by Music Canada for denoting shipments of over 50,000 copies. The album also peaked at number 26 in Australia. In the United Kingdom, Brandy never got higher than number 119 on the UK Albums Chart, but sold more than 60,000 copies, resulting in a silver certification from the British Phonographic Industry (BPI). In May 1999, it was reported that Brandy had sold five million copies worldwide; By 2010 the albums global sales stood at six million sold.

 Impact and legacy 
With the release of her debut album and the combined commercial success of its singles, Norwood had established herself a successful solo artist. The album led her to successful endeavors before the release of her second album Never Say Never (1998), including a joint tour with vocal group Boyz II Men, songs landing on successful soundtracks for films such as Waiting to Exhale (1995) and Set It Off (1996), her first starring TV role in the sitcom Moesha, and starring as the first African-American Cinderella in Cinderella (1997).

Widely acclaimed, Brandy was named one of the 50 best R&B albums of the 1990s by Complex. American neo soul singer Erykah Badu revealed on Twitter that her debut studio album Baduizm (1997) was partly influenced by Brandy, tweeting: "Brandy's first album was one of my inspirations when writing Baduizm. I looove that album [...] songs i liked were "I Wanna Be Down" and "Always on My Mind"... nice." Fellow neo soul artist Jill Scott particularly praised the songs "Sunny Day" and "Always on My Mind", saying "I listen to her shit all the time". Pop group Karmin's song "Brokenhearted" was inspired by Brandy's song of the same title. Canadian recording artist Drake sampled all three parts of "I Dedicate" on his fourth studio album Views (2016) for the song "Fire & Desire". Gospel recording artists The Walls Group covered the song "Always on My Mind", turning it into "God on My Mind".

 Track listing 

 Personnel 
Credits adapted from the liner notes of Brandy''.

 Cat Daddy Ro – keyboard
 Jerry Conaway – programming
 Keith Crouch – producer
 Kenneth Crouch – piano, producer
 Derrick Edmondson – flute, saxophone, horn
 Sherree Ford-Payne – vocal assistance
 Rochad Holiday – producer
 Kipper Jones – producer
 Robert Jones – programming, drums
 Tiara Lemacks – vocal assistance
 Arvel McClinton III – programming, producer
 Glenn McKinney – guitar
 Brandy Norwood – lead vocals
 Derek Organ – drums
 Thomas Organ – guitar
 Chacha Orias – bass
 Rahsaan Patterson – vocal assistance
 Robin Thicke – vocal assistance
 Damon Thomas – piano, keyboard, producer
 Darryl Williams – executive producer
 Curtis Wilson – producer
 Jeffrey Young – vocal assistance, arranger, producer

Charts

Weekly charts

Year-end charts

Certifications

Release history

See also 
 Album era

References

Bibliography

External links 
 Official website

1994 debut albums
Atlantic Records albums
Brandy Norwood albums
Hip hop soul albums